John R. Padova (born May 7, 1935) is a senior United States district judge of the United States District Court for the Eastern District of Pennsylvania.

Education and career

Born in Philadelphia, Pennsylvania, Padova received an Artium Baccalaureus degree from Villanova University in 1956 and a Juris Doctor from Temple University School of Law in 1959. He was in private practice in Philadelphia from 1960 to 1992, also serving in the United States Army, United States Army National Guard of New Jersey from 1959 to 1964 and in the United States Army Reserve, JAG Corps from 1964 to 1968.

Federal judicial service

On November 5, 1991, Padova was nominated by President George H. W. Bush to a new seat on the United States District Court for the Eastern District of Pennsylvania created by 104 Stat. 5089. He was confirmed by the United States Senate on March 13, 1992, and received his commission on March 18, 1992. He assumed senior status on February 11, 2008.

References

Sources

1935 births
Living people
Judges of the United States District Court for the Eastern District of Pennsylvania
Lawyers from Philadelphia
Temple University Beasley School of Law alumni
United States Army reservists
United States Army soldiers
United States district court judges appointed by George H. W. Bush
20th-century American judges
Villanova University alumni
21st-century American judges
New Jersey National Guard personnel